Bythopsyrna circulata is a species of Asian planthoppers belonging to the family Flatidae.

Description
Head, pronotum and mesonotum show black spots. Wings have quite variable brown crescents, loops and bands. There is a usually intact longitudinal dark brown band along vein R of tegmen. Basal cell is brown or black. Marking patterns may be obscured by melanism and clear areas may show orange colour. The ovipositor is primitive and adapted for piercing.

Biology and behavior
Bythopsyrna circulata has five larval stages and the winged adult hatched from the fifth.

This species, when stimulated by ants, produces large quantities of honeydew.

Distribution
This species can be found in the subtropical and tropical forests of China, Malaysia, Thailand, Sumatra and Java.

Bibliography
 Medler J. T. (1999) Flatidae (Homoptera: Fulgoroidea) of Indonesia, exclusive of Irian Jaya, Zoologische Verhandelingen (Leiden), 324: 1-88.
 Schmidt E. (1909) Zwei neue Fulgoriden aus dem Stettiner Museum, Entomologische Zeitung. Herausgegeben von dem entomologischen Vereine zu Stettin. Stettin, 70: 187-192.
 Schmidt E. (1904) Beitrag zur Kenntnis der Flatiden von Sumatra., Entomologische Zeitung. Herausgegeben von dem entomologischen Vereine zu Stettin. Stettin, 65: 182-212.
 Schmidt E. (1904) Neue und bemerkenswerthe Flatiden des Stettiner Museums, Entomologische Zeitung. Herausgegeben von dem entomologischen Vereine zu Stettin. Stettin, 65: 354-381.
 Metcalf Z. P. (1957) Part 13. Flatidae and Hypochthonellidae, In: Metcalf Z. P. 1954 - General Catalogue of the Homoptera. Fascicule IV, North Carolina State College, Raleigh(United States of America). p. 1-565.
 Stål C. (1862) Synonymiska och systematiska anteckningar öfver Hemiptera, Ofversigt af Kongliga Svenska Vetenskaps-Akademiens Förhandlingar. Stockholm, 19: 479-504.
 White A. (1845) Descriptions of a new genus and some new species of Homopterous Insects from the East in the collection of the British Museum, Annals and Magazine of Natural History. London, 15: 34-37.
 Guérin-Méneville F. E. (1844) Insectes, In: Cuvier G. L. C. F. D. 1844 - Iconographie du règne animal, 1844. p. 355-370.
 FLOW: Fulgoromorpha Lists On the WEB. Bourgoin T.

References

External links
 Macroid

Flatidae
Insects of Thailand
Insects of Malaysia
Insects described in 1844